Atif Muhammad Hussain (born 29 June 1960) is an Egyptian judoka. He competed in the men's middleweight event at the 1984 Summer Olympics, representing Egypt. He later competed at the 1992 Summer Olympics, representing Guam.

References

External links
 

1960 births
Living people
Egyptian male judoka
Guamanian male judoka
Olympic judoka of Egypt
Olympic judoka of Guam
Judoka at the 1984 Summer Olympics
Judoka at the 1992 Summer Olympics
Place of birth missing (living people)